Sarrus is a surname. Notable people with the surname include:

 Pierre-Auguste Sarrus (1813–1876), French musician and inventor
 Sarrusophone, a musical instrument
 Pierre Frédéric Sarrus (1798–1861), French mathematician
 Sarrus linkage, a mechanical linkage